The T Third Street is a Muni Metro light rail line in San Francisco, California. The line serves 22 stations, all of which are accessible. Most of the surface portion of the line runs in dedicated median lanes, though two portions operate in mixed traffic.

Construction of the line was proposed in the late 1980s as plans for the redevelopment of the Mission Bay neighborhood were established. Construction took place in the mid-2000s. Limited service began in January 2007, with full service beginning in April of the same year. It was the first line added to the Muni Metro system since the N Judah in 1928.

Operations

Route

The T Third Street's northern terminus is Chinatown station inside the Central Subway. Trains operate south below Stockton Street to Union Square/Market Street station, which offers a connection to Powell Street station as the line does not enter the Market Street subway. The line then tunnels underneath 4th Street to serve Yerba Buena/Moscone station in the SoMA district before surfacing south of the Interstate 80 bypass, where it serves a stop at Brannan Street. The T then crosses the existing N tracks at 4th and King and continues south to 3rd Street.  Additional short turn service between Chinatown and Mission Bay Loop will be later added. The line runs south through the Mission Bay neighborhood in a dedicated median, passing the Mission Bay Loop between 18th and 19th Streets, which is used to allow trains to turn around at Mission Bay or to hold special trains to serve events at Chase Center.

The line continues south through Dogpatch and across Islais Creek into the Bayview and Hunters Point neighborhoods. A wye, occasionally used for short turning trains, is located at Armstrong Avenue. The line crosses the U.S. Route 101 freeway, where Third Street becomes Bayshore Boulevard, and continues south in the median. The southern terminus of the line is at Sunnydale station in the Visitacion Valley neighborhood.

Service
The T Third operates seven days a week, beginning at 5 a.m. weekdays, 6 a.m. Saturdays and 8 a.m. Sundays, operating until 1 a.m. Service is provided by the  overnight bus during the hours that rail service is not running. On weekends, T Third Street Bus service runs from 5am until the start of rail service. The bus line largely follows the rail line, but it uses surface streets to parallel sections where the rail line has dedicated rights-of-way.

History

Construction

The line was constructed as the Third Street Light Rail Project. Testing on the line took place in summer 2006, with limited service starting on January 13, 2007, and full service beginning on April 7, 2007. T Third Street service was initially operated between Castro station and Sunnydale station. Following service changes on June 30, 2007, the T Third Street and the K Ingleside lines were interlined through the Market Street subway and Twin Peaks tunnels, resulting in a combined route from Balboa Park, through downtown, to the Visitacion Valley neighborhood.

The Mission Bay Loop project, which added a short turn loop using 18th, Illinois, and 19th, was constructed to supplement the Central Subway project. The loop was originally designed in 1998 as part of the Third Street Light Rail project, but was deferred due to insufficient funding. A $3.5 million construction contract was issued in 2014. Construction started in July 2016 and was completed in 2019. Another loop at 25th and Illinois is proposed to increase short-line service frequency between Downtown and Dogpatch.

Later changes

The underground section of the line was closed west of Castro station from June 25 to August 24, 2018, due to the Twin Peaks Tunnel shutdown. On August 25, 2018, at the conclusion of the shutdown, Muni began running permanently two-car trains on the K/T line (as had been used east of Castro during the shutdown). The line was shut down again, from January 22, 2019, until April 1, 2019, for construction of a new platform at UCSF/Mission Bay station. In April 2019, the SFMTA ended the use of unscheduled short turns. These had been used to provide more consistent service on the inner portion of the line, but had caused inconsistent and less frequent service in the Hunters Point-Bayview and Visitacion Valley neighborhoods.

On March 30, 2020, Muni Metro service was replaced with buses due to the COVID-19 pandemic. Rail service returned on August 22, with the routes reconfigured to improve reliability in the subway. T Third Street and M Ocean View light rail lines were interlined, running between Sunnydale station and Balboa Park station. Light rail service was re-replaced with buses on August 25 due to issues with malfunctioning overhead wire splices and the need to quarantine control center staff after a COVID-19 case. Rail service resumed on the Embarcadero–Sunnydale section of the T Third Street line on January 23, 2021. In preparation for the return of rail service, several temporary changes were made at the 4th Street bridge over China Basin: one southbound lane became a transit-only lane, and a northbound turn lane at Berry (which shared space with the tracks) was removed. This change was found to decrease delays at the bridge by 60%. Service was re-extended to West Portal on May 15, again through-routed with the K Ingleside.

Central Subway 

The second phase of the line was built as the Central Subway, which forms a crosstown link between South of Market (SoMa) and Chinatown via Union Square. Voters approved the Central Subway in 2003, and the alignment was selected in 2008. Construction began in 2012. The T Third Street was rerouted to travel through the Central Subway for full service on January 7, 2023. Service runs every 10 minutes on weekdays and every 12 minutes on weekends.

Station listing 
All stations along this line feature high platforms, eliminating the need for the raising and lowering of entrance and exit steps characteristic of other Muni Metro lines.

References

External links

SFMTA - K Ingleside/T Third Street

 
 

Muni Metro lines
2007 establishments in California